Marinus (born c. 440 AD) was a Neoplatonist philosopher, mathematician and rhetorician born in Flavia Neapolis (modern Nablus), Palestine. He was a student of Proclus in Athens. His surviving works are an introduction to Euclid's Data; a Life of Proclus, and two astronomical texts. Most of what we know of his life comes from an epitome of a work by Damascius conserved in the Byzantine Suda encyclopaedia.

Life
He was, according to his pupil Damascius, born a Samaritan, though some uncertainty remains about this attribution of his ethnicity. Damascius also adds that he had converted from Samaritanism.

He came to Athens at a time when, with the exception of Proclus, there was a great dearth of eminent men in the Neoplatonist school. He was appointed as successor (diadochos) to Proclus, sometime before the latter's death, during the period of the teacher's infirmity. Proclus dedicated to Marinus his commentary to the Plato's Myth of Er.

Proclus himself, it is reported, worried that Marinus himself was of delicate constitution. During this period, the professors of the old Greek religion suffered persecution at the hands of the Christians and Marinus was compelled to seek refuge at Epidaurus, where he died, at a date unknown.

Works
Only a remnant of his output survives. His chief surviving work was a biography of Proclus since it is the main source of information on Proclus' life. This was written in a combination of prose and epic hexameters, of which only the former survives.

The publication of the biography is fixed by internal evidence to the year of Proclus's death; for he mentions an eclipse which will happen when the first year after that event is completed. It was first published with the works of Marcus Aurelius in 1559; it was republished separately by Fabricius at Hamburg in 1700, and re-edited in 1814 by Boissonade with emendations and notes. He is also the author of a commentary (or introduction) on the Data of Euclid, and a commentary on Theon's Little Commentary. There is also a surviving astronomical text which discusses the Milky Way.

His lost works included commentaries on Aristotle and on the Philebus of Plato. He destroyed his commentary on the Philebus on the advice of a pupil he was tutoring, Isidorus. According to a version of the story written by Damascius, when Marinus showed his student, to whom he taught Aristotelianism, this commentary, which he had just completed, Isidorus prevailed on him to destroy it, arguing that since the 'divine' Proclus had himself written a definitive commentary which was the final word on the topic. Current scholarship suspects that this advice arose from fears that Marinus's commentary would, despite his best efforts, betray traces of material that might undermine the reigning Neoplatonic paradigm.

References

Notes

Citations

Sources

440 births
5th-century astronomers
5th-century Byzantine people
5th-century Byzantine scientists
5th-century Byzantine writers
5th-century mathematicians
5th-century philosophers
Ancient Greek biographers
Ancient Greek mathematicians
Byzantine astronomers
Late-Roman-era pagans
Hellenistic Jewish writers
Neoplatonists
Neoplatonists in Athens

Year of death unknown